Mecyna gracilis is a moth in the family Crambidae. It was described by Arthur Gardiner Butler in 1879. It is found in the Russian Far East, Japan, Taiwan and China.

The wingspan is 20–24 mm.

References

Moths described in 1879
Spilomelinae